The Commonwealth Immigrants Act 1962 was an Act of the Parliament of the United Kingdom. The Act entailed stringent restrictions on the entry of Commonwealth citizens into the United Kingdom. Only those with work permits (which were typically only for high-skilled workers, such as doctors) were permitted entry.

Background
Before the Act was passed, citizens of Commonwealth countries had extensive rights to migrate to the UK. For instance, in the sparsely populated frontier area of San Tin in Hong Kong, 85–90 percent of the able-bodied males left for the United Kingdom between 1955 and 1962 to work in British factories, foundries, railways, buses, hotels, and restaurants.

There was widespread opposition to mass migration in Britain from a variety of political groups, including the Conservative Monday Club, whose Members of Parliament were very active and vocal in their opposition thereto. In response to a perceived heavy influx of immigrants, the Conservative Party government tightened the regulations, permitting only those with government-issued employment vouchers, limited in number, to settle. The leader of the opposition in Parliament at the time, Hugh Gaitskell of the Labour Party, called the act "cruel and brutal anti-colour legislation".

The Act
The Act specified that all Commonwealth citizens, including citizens of the UK and Colonies (CUKCs), without a relevant connection to the UK were subject to immigration control. A person was exempt from immigration control if the person was a Commonwealth citizen born in the UK; a Commonwealth citizen holding a passport issued by the UK government in either the UK or Republic of Ireland; a CUKC holding a passport issued by the UK Government (not including colonial governments) anywhere; and their family members. Exemptions also applied to Commonwealth citizens who were ordinarily resident in the UK at any point from 1960 to 1962, as well as wives and children under 16 accompanying a family member resident in the UK.

The Act went into effect on 1st July 1962.

According to Claudia Jones, a Trinidad-born Communist activist, the Act "established a second class citizenship status for West Indians and other Afro-Asian peoples in Britain." She predicted that if it passed, the Act "could be the death knell of the Commonwealth." Ambalavaner Sivanandan, an anti-racist activist, argued that the Act served to 'enshrine state racism in law', while Labour politician Barbara Castle labelled it 'a violation of the very idea of the Commonwealth.'

Aftermath
The Act cut 'racialised colony and Commonwealth entrants' from an estimated 136,400 in 1961 to 57,046 in 1963.

The Act was amended by the Commonwealth Immigrants Act 1968 and was superseded by another new Act, the Immigration Act 1971.

References

External links
Copy of the Act as originally passed archive.org

1962 in law
United Kingdom Acts of Parliament 1962
Immigration law in the United Kingdom
British Indian history
1962 in international relations
Immigration legislation
United Kingdom and the Commonwealth of Nations